James William Revill (14 June 1891 – 7 April 1917) was an English footballer who played for Sheffield United. Born in Sutton-in-Ashfield, he remained at the club until his death during active service in France during World War I.

Playing career
Revill spent the majority of his time at Bramall Lane in the reserves, only achieving short runs in the first team due to injuries to others. Despite this he still made sixty starts for the Blades before the outbreak of war in Europe.

Having enlisted for the army he served in the Royal Engineers in France until 1917 when it was reported he had been killed in action. It was later suggested that he had only been wounded and had actually died of his injuries in a military hospital on his return to England. Revill died at the 33rd Casualty Clearing Station, Béthune of a gunshot wound to the back on 9 April 1917. A benefit match was held for his widow and children at Bramall Lane in 1918.

References

1891 births
1917 deaths
Sportspeople from Sutton-in-Ashfield
Footballers from Nottinghamshire
English footballers
English Football League players
Sheffield United F.C. players
Royal Engineers soldiers
British Army personnel of World War I
British military personnel killed in World War I
Chesterfield F.C. wartime guest players
Ashfield United F.C. wartime guest players
Association football forwards
Deaths by firearm in France